Cliff Wright, Jr. (born January 22, 1979) is an American mixed martial artist currently competing in the Welterweight division. A professional since 2008, he has fought in Bellator MMA.

Mixed martial arts career

Early career
From September 2008 to March 2012, Wright compiled a record of 6–2 before debuting for Bellator.

Bellator MMA
Wright made his Bellator debut on May 18, 2012, at Bellator 69 against Josh Quayhagen, losing via unanimous decision.

Wright faced Bobby Reardanz at Bellator 75 on October 5, 2012. He won via rear-naked choke submission in round one.

Wright then faced Christian Uflacker at Bellator 84 on December 14, 2012. He lost via technical unanimous decision after an upkick delivered by Wright was determined to be illegal by the referee, rendering Uflacker unable to continue.

Wright fought Donald Sanchez at Bellator 97 on July 31, 2013. He lost the bout via split decision.

Wright faced Derek Loffer on October 18, 2013, at Bellator 104. He won via armbar submission in the second round.

Wright fought LaRue Burley at Bellator 117 on April 18, 2014, and lost via unanimous decision.

Mixed martial arts record

|-
|Loss
|align=center|12–19
|Gauge Young
|Submission (arm-triangle choke)
|FAC 10
|
|align=center|1
|align=center|3:18
|Independence, Missouri, United States
|
|-
|Loss
|align=center|12–18
|William Starks
|Submission (rear-naked choke)
|Midwest Fight League
|
|align=center|2
|align=center|3:06
|Columbia, Missouri, United States
|
|-
|Loss
|align=center|12–17
|Brok Weaver
|TKO (punches)
|Gamebred Fighting Championships 1
|
|align=center|2
|align=center|2:38
|Biloxi, Mississippi, United States
|
|-
|Loss
|align=center|12–16
|Chance Rencountre
|Submission (rear-naked choke)
|FAC 8
|
|align=center|1
|align=center|4:58
|Kansas City, Missouri, United States
|Welterweight bout.
|-
|Loss
|align=center|12–15
|Jason Knight
|Submission (rear-naked choke)
|iKon Fighting Federation 5
|
|align=center|2
|align=center|1:48
|Biloxi, Mississippi, United States
|
|-|-
|Loss
|align=center|12–14
|Khasan Askhabov
|Submission (rear-naked choke)
|iKon Fighting Federation 1
|
|align=center|2
|align=center|2:24
|Biloxi, Mississippi, United States
|
|-
|Loss
|align=center|12–13
|Brian Foster
|Submission (kimura)
|MMAX FC 9: High Stakes 2
|
|align=center|1
|align=center|2:20
|Poteau, Oklahoma, United States
|
|-
|Win
|align=center|12–12
|Thomas Gifford
|KO (punch)
|Pyramid Fights 15
|
|align=center|1
|align=center|0:33
|Benton, Arkansas, United States
|
|-
|Loss
|align=center|11–12
|Jason Witt
|Decision (unanimous)
|Kansas City Fighting Alliance 34: Fight 4 The Troops
|
|align=center|3
|align=center|5:00
|Independence, Missouri, United States
|
|-
|Win
|align=center|11–11
|Kevin Brown Jr.
|Submission (rear-naked choke)
|Walkout FC 15
|
|align=center|1
|align=center|1:16
|Rogers, Arkansas, United States
|
|-
|Loss
|align=center|10–11
|Austin Hubbard
|Decision (unanimous)
|Caged Aggression 18: Next Level
|
|align=center|5
|align=center|5:00
|Council Bluffs, Iowa, United States
|For Caged Aggression Welterweight Championship.
|-
|Loss
|align=center|10–10
|Perry Olson
|Decision (unanimous)
|KOTC: Due Process
|
|align=center|3
|align=center|5:00
|Carlton, Minnesota, United States
|
|-
|Win
|align=center|10–9
|Evian Rodriguez
|Submission (arm-triangle choke)
|RCC: Revolution Cage Combat
|
|align=center|1
|align=center|1:55
|Iowa City, Iowa, United States
|Welterweight debut.
|-
|Loss
|align=center|9–9
|Ramiro Hernandez
|Decision (unanimous)
|EC: Extreme Challenge 233
|
|align=center|5
|align=center|5:00
|Clinton, Iowa, United States
|Catchweight (160 lbs) bout; for Extreme Challenge Lightweight Championship.
|-
|Loss
|align=center|9–8
|Robert Rojas Jr.
|Decision (unanimous)
|DCS: Spring Brawl 4
|
|align=center|5
|align=center|5:00
|Lincoln, Nebraska, United States
|For DCS Lightweight Championship.
|-
|Win
|align=center|9–7
|Tom Shoaff
|Submission
|TFE: Gladiators
|
|align=center|1
|align=center|3:04
|Indianapolis, Indiana, United States
|
|-
|Loss
|align=center|8–7
|Eric Wisely
|Decision (unanimous)
|Pinnacle Combat 21
|
|align=center|5
|align=center|5:00
|Dubuque, Iowa, United States
|For Pinnacle MMA Lightweight Championship.
|-
|Loss
|align=center|8–6
|LaRue Burley
|Decision (unanimous)
|Bellator 117
|
|align=center|3
|align=center|5:00
|Council Bluffs, Iowa, United States
|Returned to Lightweight.
|-
|Win
|align=center|8–5
|Derek Loffer
|Submission (armbar)
|Bellator 104
|
|align=center|2
|align=center|4:28
|Cedar Rapids, Iowa, United States
|
|-
|Loss
|align=center|7–5
|Donald Sanchez
|Decision (split)
|Bellator 97
|
|align=center|3
|align=center|5:00
|Rio Rancho, New Mexico, Mexico
|
|-
|Loss
|align=center|7–4
|Christian Uflacker
|Technical Decision (unanimous)
|Bellator 84
|
|align=center|3
|align=center|2:26
|Hammond, Indiana, United States
| 
|-
|Win
|align=center|7–3
|Bobby Reardanz
|Submission (rear-naked choke)
|Bellator 75
|
|align=center|1
|align=center|3:39
|Hammond, Indiana, United States
|
|-
|Loss
|align=center|6–3
|Josh Quayhagen
|Decision (unanimous)
|Bellator 69
|
|align=center|3
|align=center|5:00
|Lake Charles, Louisiana, United States
|
|-
|Win
|align=center|6–2
|Dakota Cochrane
|Technical Submission (rear-naked choke)
|RFA 2: Yvel vs. Alexander
|
|align=center|1
|align=center|4:39
|Kearney, Nebraska, United States
|
|-
|Win
|align=center|5–2
|Mark Herman
|Submission (choke)
|Extreme Challenge 203
|
|align=center|1
|align=center|0:56
|Bettendorf, Iowa, United States
|
|-
|Win
|align=center|4–2
|Mike Lindquist
|Submission (guillotine choke)
|Extreme Challenge 187
|
|align=center|1
|align=center|1:08
|Cedar Rapids, Iowa, United States
|
|-
|Win
|align=center|3–2
|Drew Mehaffy
|Submission (armbar)
|Mainstream MMA: Swing Back
|
|align=center|1
|align=center|1:01
|Cedar Rapids, Iowa, United States
|
|-
|Loss
|align=center|2–2
|Ryan Bixler
|TKO (punches)
|Glory Fighting Championships 7
|
|align=center|3
|align=center|N/A
|Des Moines, Iowa, United States
|
|-
|Win
|align=center|2–1
|Jeremy Castro
|Submission (triangle choke)
|Pinnacle Combat MMA 2
|
|align=center|2
|align=center|1:40
|Dubuque, Iowa, United States
|
|-
|Loss
|align=center|1–1
|Mike Lullo
|Decision (unanimous)
|Xtreme Fighting Organization 28
|
|align=center|3
|align=center|5:00
|Lakemoor, Illinois, United States
|
|-
|Win
|align=center|1–0
|Aubrey Bailey
|Submission (rear-naked choke)
|Conquest Fighting Championship 1
|
|align=center|1
|align=center|1:21
|Des Moines, Iowa, United States
|

Bare knuckle record

|Loss
|align=center|0–1
|David Rickels
|Decision (unanimous)
|BKFC 13: Beltran vs. Stamps
| 
|align=center|5
|align=center|2:00
|Salina, Kansas, United States
|
|-

References

Living people
1979 births
American male mixed martial artists
Lightweight mixed martial artists
Mixed martial artists utilizing boxing
American male boxers
Bare-knuckle boxers
People from Iowa City, Iowa
Sportspeople from Cedar Rapids, Iowa